Birthing the Giant is Cancer Bats' first full-length album. It was released on June 6, 2006, by Distort Entertainment in Canada and on September 5, 2006, by Abacus Recordings in the US.

Videos were shot for "100 Grand Canyon," "French Immersion," and "Pneumonia Hawk."

Critical reception
Exclaim! wrote that "with all the swagger of Southern rock but all the slummy goodness of New York City punk, the Cancer Bats slam through 12 impressively heavy tracks." The Skinny called the album "a pick-squealing romp of metal riffery interspersed with some slamming punk chord progressions."

Track listing
"Golden Tanks" – 3:46
"French Immersion" – 3:10
"Grenades" – 3:51
"Shillelagh" – 3:19
"Butterscotch" – 3:08
"Death Bros" – 4:48
"Firecrack This" – 3:30
"Diamond Mine" – 4:16
"100 Grand Canyon" – 2:44
"Ghost Bust That" – 3:47
"Pneumonia Hawk" (featuring George Pettit of Alexisonfire) – 3:55

Bonus track
"Roy Rogers Party" – 3:28

References

External links
Official Website
Official Cancer Bats Myspace page
"Birthing The Giant" album lyrics

Cancer Bats albums
2006 debut albums
Distort Entertainment albums